State Road 509 (NM 509) is a  state highway in the US state of New Mexico. NM 509's southern terminus is at NM 605 north of Grants, and the northern terminus is at Navajo Route 9 west of Whitehorse.

Major intersections

See also

References

509
Transportation in McKinley County, New Mexico